XHUAR-FM (106.7 MHz) is a Rock En Español and News radio station licensed to Ciudad Juárez, Chihuahua, owned by IMER (Instituto Mexicano de la Radio), Mexico's public radio network. Like the Public Radio stations in the United States, IMER presents a variety of discussion and music programs.

XHUAR-FM broadcasts three channels in HD.

History
XHUAR-FM signed on July 1, 1986 as "Estéreo Norte" with the remit of offering a Mexican alternative to the Americanized media of the area. By the early 1990s it was offering ballad music, which changed to rock in 1993. Meanwhile, speech programs diminished on XHUAR's broadcast day.

In 1996, the station adopted the Órbita name and format then in use on IMER's XHOF-FM in Mexico City. The station went 24 hours in 1999.

References

External links

Radio stations in Chihuahua
Mass media in Ciudad Juárez